Thundersbarrow Hill is an archaeological site in West Sussex, England. It is on a chalk ridge, aligned north-west to south-east, on the South Downs north of Shoreham-by-Sea.

There is an Iron Age hillfort; also a bowl barrow and a Martin Down style enclosure of the Bronze Age; and traces of a Romano-British farming village. The site is a scheduled monument.

Description
There was some excavation in 1932 by E. C. Curwen, and in 1985 by D. Rudling.

Hillfort
There are entrances at the north and south-east. Analysis of pottery sherds have shown that the fort was constructed in the 6th century BC and in use until the mid 3rd century BC.

Martin Down style enclosure
Inside the fort is a Martin Down style enclosure, so named after the Bronze Age enclosure on Martin Down in Hampshire, interpreted as a domestic settlement. From analysis of pottery sherds from the (now infilled) ditch, it is thought that the enclosure was in use in the 10th and 9h centuries BC.

Barrow

Romano-British village
To the east and north of the fort are the buried remains of a Romano-British village.

References

Hill forts in West Sussex
Scheduled monuments in West Sussex
Hills of West Sussex